Anne Argula is a pen name used by Darryl Ponicsan for several mysteries set in the Pacific Northwest. He was born in Northeast Pennsylvania and currently resides in Seattle, Washington.

The first novel in the series, Homicide My Own (2005) is about a cop who solves his own murder from a previous life. It was nominated for an Edgar Award.

The second in the series is Walla Walla Suite (2007), which follows Quinn, who narrated the first book. Now she is in Seattle and working for a mitigation investigator until she is drawn into an unusual murder case.

The third in the series is Krapp's Last Cassette, in which Quinn is hired by a screenwriter to verify the existence of a writer whose book he is adapting for HBO. The title is a play on the title of Samuel Beckett's Krapp's Last Tape.

The fourth and final of the series is "The Other Romanian," in which Quinn becomes involved in recovering an 18 karat bookmark that belonged to Hitler, given to him by his mistress.

Argula's Quinn novels are marked by humor and coal regions idiom.

Bibliography
 Homicide My Own (Pleasure Boat Studio, 2005 )
 Walla Walla Suite (Ballantine Books, 2007 )
 Krapp's Last Cassette (Ballantine Books, 2009 )
 The Other Romanian (Pleasure Boat Studio, 2012 )

References 

Living people
21st-century American novelists
American male novelists
Novelists from Pennsylvania
Writers from Seattle
American mystery novelists
21st-century American male writers
Novelists from Washington (state)
1938 births